Henry Anthony Camillo Howard (3 March 1913 – 15 October 1977) was a British journalist, military officer, and colonial leader in the Caribbean.

Early life and family 
Howard was the son of Esme Howard, 1st Baron Howard of Penrith and Isabella Giovanna Teresa Gioachina Giustiniani-Bandini. Isabella was the daughter of Sigismundo Giustiniani-Bandini the 8th Earl of Newburgh. Howard married on 11 September 1937 Adele Le Bourgeois Alsop, daughter of Reece Denny Alsop, of New York, and of Julia Sanford Chapin Alsop later Mrs. Basil de Selincourt, of Far End, Kingham, Oxfordshire. (Julia Sanford Chapin was an American who had grown up abroad as her father Robert Williams Chapin represented exports of American mining tool companies.
) They had five children: 
 Mary Rosalind Howard, now Mary Howard Lowe; mother of one son (who has three children of his own) 
 Susan Isabella Howard, who died in 1963
 Joan Dacre Howard; mother of one son and one daughter (perhaps parents of the four remaining great-grandchildren)
 (Adele Cristina) Sophia Howard, wife of Hon. Timothy Palmer, scion patrilineally of the earls of Selborne; they have issue two sons and two daughters, and 
 Charlotte Fell Howard.

His widow died in her sleep on 15 February 2011 in Cumbria, leaving issue four of five daughters (their second daughter dying in her twenties), and four grandsons, three granddaughters, who produced seven great-grandchildren.

Career 
Educated at the Royal Military College, Sandhurst, Howard became a journalist on the Financial Times and The Economist, then during the Second World War returned to the British Army as an officer, serving in the Somaliland Camel Corps in British Somaliland. After the war he joined the Colonial Office and was Governor of the British Virgin Islands from 1954 to 1956, then Administrator of Saint Kitts-Nevis-Anguilla from 1956 to 1966.

Howard became separated from his wife when he would not move back to England. Because he was Roman Catholic he chose not to seek a divorce, but he began a relationship with a European woman from Saint Kitts who had her name changed to Howard by deed poll.

See also 
List of colonial heads of the British Virgin Islands

References 

1913 births
1977 deaths
Coldstream Guards officers
British Army personnel of World War II
Younger sons of barons
Henry Anthony Camillo Howard
Somaliland Camel Corps officers
Governors of the British Virgin Islands
Graduates of the Royal Military College, Sandhurst
British Somaliland people of World War II
Governors of Saint Christopher-Nevis-Anguilla
Speakers of the National Assembly (Saint Kitts and Nevis)